Schizocypris ladigesi is a species of cyprinid in the genus Schizocypris. It inhabits Afghanistan's Kankae river and is considered harmless to humans.

References

Cyprinid fish of Asia
Fish of Afghanistan
Fish described in 1969